Alejandro Castellanos (born August 29, 1979) is a Honduran former swimmer, who specialized in sprint freestyle events. Castellanos represented Honduras at the 2000 Summer Olympics, where he became the nation's flag bearer in the opening ceremony.

Castellanos competed only in the men's 100 m freestyle at the 2000 Summer Olympics in Sydney. He received a Universality place from FINA, in an entry time of 53.43. He challenged seven other swimmers in heat three, including Trinidad and Tobago's 16-year-old George Bovell and Seychelles' three-time Olympian Kenny Roberts. He rounded out the field to last place in 54.06, just 0.63 seconds below his entry standard. Castellanos failed to advance into the semifinals, as he placed sixty-fourth overall in the prelims.

References

External links 
 

1979 births
Living people
Honduran male freestyle swimmers
Olympic swimmers of Honduras
Swimmers at the 2000 Summer Olympics
20th-century Honduran people
21st-century Honduran people